Talyzino is a rural locality (a village) in Borisoglebskoye Rural Settlement, Muromsky District, Vladimir Oblast, Russia. The population was 137 as of 2010. There are 4 streets.

Geography 
Talyzino is located 29 km north of Murom (the district's administrative centre) by road. Ignatyevo is the nearest rural locality.

References 

Rural localities in Muromsky District